Osage is a town in Osage County, Oklahoma, United States. Also known as Osage City, it lies within the Osage Reservation on the shore of Lake Keystone. The population was 156 at the 2010 census, down 17 percent from the figure of 188 recorded in 2000.

Geography
The town is 31 miles south of Pawhuska.

Demographics

As of the census of 2000, there were 188 people, 80 households, and 54 families residing in the town. There were 108 housing units at an average density of 336.3 per square mile (130.3/km2). The racial makeup of the town was 78.19% White, 0.53% African American, 11.70% Native American, and 9.57% from two or more races.

There were 80 households, out of which 30.0% had children under the age of 18 living with them, 57.5% were married couples living together, 7.5% had a female householder with no husband present, and 32.5% were non-families. 27.5% of all households were made up of individuals, and 10.0% had someone living alone who was 65 years of age or older. The average household size was 2.35 and the average family size was 2.89.

In the town, the population was spread out, with 23.9% under the age of 18, 6.9% from 18 to 24, 26.1% from 25 to 44, 25.0% from 45 to 64, and 18.1% who were 65 years of age or older. The median age was 40 years. For every 100 females, there were 108.9 males. For every 100 females age 18 and over, there were 113.4 males.

The median income for a household in the town was $25,125, and the median income for a family was $24,375. Males had a median income of $26,500 versus $30,000 for females. The per capita income for the town was $15,875. About 23.5% of families and 21.8% of the population were below the poverty line, including 23.3% of those under the age of eighteen and 10.0% of those sixty-five or over.

In popular culture 
A fictional Osage, Oklahoma, is the main town depicted in the novel Cimarron by Edna Ferber and the film based on it, which won three Academy Awards, including Best Picture.

References

Towns in Osage County, Oklahoma
Towns in Oklahoma